Donlon may refer to:

People 
Alphonsus J. Donlon (1867–1923), American Jesuit priest
 Billy Donlon (born 1977), American college basketball coach
 Chris Donlon (born 1977), Australian rules football field umpire
 Denise Donlon (born 1956), Canadian executive, television producer, television host
 Dolores Donlon (1920–2012), American model and actress
 J.P. Donlon, Editor-in-Chief of Chief Executive magazine
 Marguerite Donlon (born 1966), Irish dancer, choreographer and ballet director
 Mary H. Donlon (1893–1977), American lawyer and politician
 Peter Donlon (1906–1979), American rower
 Roger Donlon (born 1934), retired United States Army officer

Places 
 Mary Donlon Hall,  a residence hall located on Cornell North Campus